The Archipelago of San Bernardo is a set of nine coastal coral islands and one artificial island (ten in total) belonging to and governed by Colombia, located in the Gulf of Morrosquillo in the Caribbean Sea, with an approximate area of 213 km2.  Administratively, the archipelago belongs to the Bolívar Department, with the exception of Boquerón Island, which belongs to the Sucre Department. It consists of Boquerón Island, Cabruna Island, Ceycén Island, Mangle Island, Múcura Island, Palma Island, Panda Island, Santa Cruz del Islote (English: Santa Cruz Islet, an artificial island), Tintipán Island and Maravilla Island. All the 10 islands are close to the towns Tolu and Coveñas.

Since 1996, part of the archipelago belongs to the Rosario and San Bernardo Corals National Natural Park.

Lodging facilities are present on some of the islands, primarily Múcura Island and Palma Island.

Flora and fauna
Waters around the islands have fish and turtles, and the islands have significant tropical flora.

Geography

See also

 Caribbean region of Colombia
 Insular region of Colombia
 List of islands of South America

References

Further reading 

 
 
 

Archipelagoes of the Caribbean Sea
Geography of Bolívar Department
Caribbean islands of Colombia
Underwater diving sites in the Caribbean
Underwater diving sites in Colombia